Libby is a given name and a surname. It may also refer to:

Places

United States
 Libby, Minnesota, an unincorporated community
 Libby Township, Aitkin County, Minnesota 
 Libby, Montana, a city
 Libby, Oregon, an unincorporated community
 Libby Army Airfield, in Sierra Vista, Arizona
 Libby Creek, Wyoming
 Libby Creek (Washington), Washington
 Libby Islands, two islands in Machias Bay, Maine 
 Libby Prison, a Confederate prison in Richmond, Virginia, during the American Civil War

Outer space
5672 Libby, an asteroid

Other uses
 Libby station, Libby, Montana, a railway station
 Libby Dam, a dam on the Kootenai River in Montana
 Libby High School, Montana, on the National Register of Historic Places
 Libby (service), a library app by OverDrive, Inc.
 Libby's, an American food company founded in 1869, now part of ConAgra Foods and Nestlé Worldwide

See also
 Libbey (disambiguation)